Azzeddine Toufiqui (born 25 April 1999) is a French professional footballer who plays as a midfielder for Eredivisie club FC Emmen.

Career

Early career 
Toufiqui spent a major part of his youth career in the academy of Caen before joining Paris Saint-Germain in 2015. From 2017 to 2019, he was part of club's reserve squad which played in the Championnat National 2. In February 2019, he was called up to senior team's matchday squad twice by Thomas Tuchel, but failed to get any playing minutes.

Caen 
On 31 August 2019, Toufiqui's former club Caen announced his signing on a three-year deal. He made his professional debut two weeks later on 13 September, in a 2–1 loss against Troyes.

FC Emmen 
In July 2021, Toufiqui signed for FC Emmen in the Netherlands.

Personal life
Born to a Moroccan father and an Algerian mother in France, Toufiqui is eligible to represent all three countries. He is the younger brother of former French youth international Sabri Toufiqui.

Honours
Emmen
Eerste Divisie: 2021–22

References

External links
 
 SM Caen Profile

Living people
1999 births
Footballers from Caen
Association football midfielders
French footballers
French sportspeople of Moroccan descent
French sportspeople of Algerian descent
Ligue 2 players
Championnat National 3 players
Stade Malherbe Caen players
Paris Saint-Germain F.C. players